St Erth railway station is a Grade II listed station situated at Rose-an-Grouse in Cornwall, United Kingdom. The station is  measured from  via .

History
The station was opened by the West Cornwall Railway on 11 March 1852. This was an important harbour with a busy fishing trade and tin and copper mines; the new railway brought it artists and then tourists. The station was a simple single platform situated on the north side of the line.

On 1 June 1877 a branch line was opened from here to St Ives, which was when the station was renamed 'St Erth'. The station building was reconstructed in granite  and a second track was laid on the north side of the platform for branch line trains, but the main line still had only the one track.
Beyond the St Ives branch platform was the station goods yard and sidings which served a china clay dry for a few years. It then served milk trains from the Primrose Dairy creamery, later operated by United Dairies, although these were taken out of use in 1982. A camping coach was positioned here by the Western Region from 1953 to 1964, there were two coaches here for the last three years.

Stationmasters

W.W. Hall ca. 1880 ca. 1885
Frederick Marshall Cause 1890 - 1897 (afterwards station master at Acton)
A.E. Hawker 1898 - 1923
J. Cocking 1923 - 1926
Robert John May 1926 - 1934 (formerly station master at Ivybridge)
Richard Petrus Grenfell 1934 - 1940 (afterwards station master at St Ives)
J. Shipton 1940 - ca. 1950
William John Martin 1955 - 1961  (formerly station master at Marazion)

Facilities

The station buildings are constructed of granite in an 'L' shape west and north of the St Ives bay platform.  The booking office is staffed for part of the day and is located in the west-facing section which faces the station car park.  The northern range incorporates staff accommodation as well as refreshment facilities which appeared in a list of the ten best station cafes published in The Guardian in 2009. Platforms 2 and 3 have a long canopy above them to protect passengers waiting for their train.  At the west end of this is a covered footbridge which links with the main westbound platform for trains to Penzance, and a large wooden shelter is provided here.  A small granite building further up the platform is for staff use.  As with several other stations in Cornwall, small palm trees grow on the main platforms, both of which can accommodate seven-coach trains.

In 2017, a new concourse and ticket office was opened in St Erth, replacing the old ticket office which was smaller. The new building now includes toilet facilities and a waiting lounge, including a medium-sized ticket office with two windows. This process also included upgraded step-free access to the concourse and to platforms 2 & 3. A new entrance to platforms 2 & 3 near to the station café was also built, next to an also new private building for staff only. An improved transport interchange is under construction in 2018.

Platform layout 

 Platform 1 is the westbound platform and is used by almost all services to Penzance, with the exception of those originating from St Ives.
 Platform 2 is the eastbound platform and is predominantly used for services towards Truro, Plymouth, Exeter, London and Bristol, as well as a small number of services that go to St Ives from Penzance.
 Platform 3 is a bay platform that is exclusively used by trains to/from St Ives.
 Alongside platform 3 is a loading bay that was previously used for goods trains towards St Ives.

Because the main line is on a falling gradient towards Hayle, at the buffer stop end of platform 3 a few steps are needed to connect platforms 2 and 3 but at the east end they are nearly level. Standing at this end of the station the line to St Ives curves away to the left over Western Growers Crossing towards the covered way beneath the A30 road. The Cornish Main Line towards Hayle drops gently to the right with the signal box situated between the two. The Down Sidings on the right of the main line are level and so are higher than the main line at the far end.

Signalling

The signal box is situated at the east end of the station between the main line and the St Ives branch. It was opened on 10 September 1899 when the main line was doubled to Hayle and replaced an earlier box that dated from around the time of the opening of the St Ives branch. Semaphore signals still control movements around the station. The signal box also controls trains on the St Ives branch.

Passenger volume
St Erth sees more passengers change train than any other station in Cornwall.

The statistics cover twelve month periods that start in April.

Services

Some trains run through to or from London Paddington station, including the Night Riviera overnight sleeping car service and the Golden Hind which offers an early morning service to London and an evening return. Other fast trains are the mid-morning Cornish Riviera and the afternoon Royal Duchy. Frequent services on the St Ives Bay Line are operated by Great Western Railway. A small number of these trains are extended from or to Penzance.

There are a limited number of CrossCountry trains (3 per day each way) providing a service to Scotland in the morning and returning in the evening.

On an average weekday St Erth sees up to 69 trains, 26 trains to St Ives, 22 towards Penzance and 21 towards Plymouth. This makes it the busiest station in Cornwall in terms of services.

References

External links

 Panoramic photograph of platforms at night
 Panoramic photograph of platforms in day
 Nick Stanton's Flickr Images of St Erth Station 2007
 Video footage and history of St Erth station.

Grade II listed buildings in Cornwall
Railway stations in Cornwall
Railway stations in Great Britain opened in 1852
Former Great Western Railway stations
Railway stations served by Great Western Railway
Railway stations served by CrossCountry
1852 establishments in England
DfT Category E stations